Ewa Synowska (born 19 August 1974) is a retired Polish medley swimmer who won a bronze medal at the 1991 European Aquatics Championships. She also competed in three events at the 1992 Summer Olympics and finished eighth in the 200 m and 400 m medley. She won during her career nine national titles.

References

1974 births
Polish female medley swimmers
Swimmers at the 1992 Summer Olympics
Olympic swimmers of Poland
Sportspeople from Kraków
Living people
European Aquatics Championships medalists in swimming